Mark Christian Ashton ( – ) was a British gay rights activist and co-founder of the Lesbians and Gays Support the Miners (LGSM) support group. He was a member of the Communist Party of Great Britain and general secretary of the Young Communist League.

Biography
Ashton was born in Oldham, and moved to Portrush, County Antrim, Northern Ireland, where he grew up. He studied at the former Northern Ireland Hotel and Catering College in Portrush, before moving to London in 1978. Richard Coles wrote about this period: "Mark also worked for a while as a barman at the Conservative Club in King’s Cross, or, rather, as a barmaid, in drag, with a blonde beehive wig. I was never sure if the patrons worked out that he was really a man".

In 1982 he spent three months in Bangladesh visiting his parents, where his father was working for the textile machinery industry. The experience of his sojourn had a profound effect on him. Upon his return, he volunteered with the London Lesbian and Gay Switchboard, supported the Campaign for Nuclear Disarmament and joined the Young Communist League. In 1983 he featured in the Lesbian and Gay Youth Video Project film Framed Youth: The Revenge of the Teenage Perverts, an early documentary that won the Grierson Award 1984 for Best Documentary.

He formed, with his friend Mike Jackson, the Lesbians and Gays Support the Miners (LGSM) support group after the two men collected donations for the miners on strike at the 1984 Lesbian and Gay Pride march in London. The group was formed in Ashton's flat in Claydon House on the Heygate Estate, Elephant and Castle.

After LGSM, he became involved in the Red Wedge collective and became the General Secretary of the Young Communist League from 1985 to 1986.

Diagnosed with HIV/AIDS, Ashton was admitted to Guy's Hospital on 30 January 1987 and died 12 days later of Pneumocystis pneumonia. His death prompted a significant response from the gay community, particularly in publication and attendance at his funeral at Lambeth Cemetery.

Legacy
In his memory, the Mark Ashton Trust was created to raise money for individuals living with HIV, and  it had raised £20,000. Since 2008, the Terrence Higgins Trust has included the Mark Ashton Red Ribbon Fund, which had collected more than £38,000 . Mark Ashton is also remembered on a panel on the UK AIDS Memorial Quilt and has been memorialised in May 2014 on a plaque at the entrance to the London headquarters of the Terrence Higgins Trust.

In 2017, on what would have been Ashton's 57th birthday, a blue plaque was unveiled in his honour above the Gay's The Word bookshop in Marchmont Street, London, the site where LGSM met and held meetings during the miners' strike.

The ballad "For a Friend" in the album Red from synth-pop duo The Communards was written in his memory. Mark Hooper of The Rough Guide to Rock writes that this cut may be Somerville's "most impassioned moment". Ashton was a friend of both Jimmy Somerville and Richard Coles. For a Friend reached number 28 on the British charts.

The Constantine Giannaris film Jean Genet Is Dead (1989) is dedicated to his memory.

The LGSM's activities were dramatised in Pride, a film released in September 2014 featuring Ben Schnetzer as Ashton. Ashton's role in the Lesbians and Gays Support the Miners group was recalled in a series of interviews with some of its other members prior to the film's release. However, Ashton's membership in the Young Communist League was not explicitly mentioned in the film, possibly to avoid alienating American audiences. Fellow communist activist and a close friend of Mark Ashton, Lorraine Douglas, accused the film of having "glossed over Mark's politics and said nothing about the fact he subsequently became General Secretary of the YCL", the youth wing of the Communist Party of Great Britain.

Schnetzer, an American actor, was nominated for two British Independent Film Awards for his performance.

On 2 June 2021, the Causeway Coast and Glens Borough Council approved the erection of a memorial blue plaque in his hometown of Portrush.

On 28 August 2022, a tree was planted in St Columbs park in memory of Mark Ashton, as part of the 2022 Foyle pride events. His former LGSM member Mike Jackson and civil rights activist Bernadette McAliskey were in attendance.

See also 
 Claudia Jones

References

Bibliography
 
 
 
 
 
 
 
 
 
 
 
 
 
 
 
 
 
 
 
 
 
 
 
 

1960 births
1987 deaths
AIDS-related deaths in England
British Roman Catholics
Communist Party of Great Britain members
Young Communist League of Britain members
People from Oldham
People from Portrush
English LGBT rights activists
English gay men
LGBT rights activists from Northern Ireland
Gay men from Northern Ireland
20th-century LGBT people from Northern Ireland